Jay J. Carty Jr. (July 4, 1941 – May 4, 2017) was a basketball player, public speaker, church consultant, and ministry leader.

He played collegiate basketball for Oregon State University, and was selected by the St. Louis Hawks in the 6th round (48th pick overall) of the 1962 NBA draft. He played for the Los Angeles Lakers (1968–69) in the National Basketball Association for 28 games.

Later, Carty worked in business in Oregon and Southern California.

Jay went on to a career in public speaking, founding "Yes! Ministries," speaking to thousands of youth and families across America.  Jay authored many books, including books written with UCLA coach, John Wooden.

In 2012, Carty was diagnosed with multiple myeloma.  He died from this disease on May 4, 2017, aged 75.

References

External links

1941 births
2017 deaths
American men's basketball players
Basketball players from California
Deaths from multiple myeloma
Los Angeles Lakers players
Oregon State Beavers men's basketball players
People from Ridgecrest, California
Power forwards (basketball)
St. Louis Hawks draft picks